Jaime Castrillo Zapater (born 13 March 1996 in Jaca) is a Spanish cyclist, who currently rides for UCI ProTeam .

Major results
2014
 1st  Road race, National Junior Road Championships
2017
 National Under-23 Road Championships
1st  Time trial
10th Road race
2018
 6th Road race, UCI Under-23 Road World Championships
2020
 2nd Overall Tour of Serbia
 4th Time trial, National Road Championships
 6th Belgrade Banjaluka
2021
 9th Overall Giro del Friuli Venezia Giulia

References

External links

1996 births
Living people
Spanish male cyclists
People from Jaca
Sportspeople from the Province of Huesca